Patricia Jean Griffin (born March 16, 1964) is an American singer, songwriter, and musician. She is a vocalist and plays guitar and piano. She is known for her stripped-down songwriting style in the folk music genre. Her songs have been covered by numerous musicians, including Emmylou Harris, Ellis Paul, Kelly Clarkson, Rory Block, Dave Hause, Sugarland, Bette Midler and The Chicks.

In 2007, Griffin received the Artist of the Year award from the Americana Music Association, and her album Children Running Through won the award for Best Album. In 2011, Griffin's album Downtown Church won the Grammy Award for Best Traditional Gospel Album and her 2019 self-titled album won the Grammy Award for Best Folk Album.

Biography
Griffin is from Old Town, Maine, United States, next to the Penobscot Native American reservation. The youngest child in her family, with six older siblings, she bought a guitar for $50 at age 16. She sang and played but had no inclination to become a professional musician. After a 6-year marriage, which ended in 1994, Griffin began playing in Boston coffee houses and was "scouted" by A&M Records, which signed her on the strength of her demo tape. When the finished studio recordings were submitted to A&M, the company executives thought it was overproduced, so producer Nile Rodgers and A&M instead released a stripped-down reworking of her demo tape as the album Living with Ghosts.

Griffin's second album, Flaming Red, released in 1998, was a departure from the acoustic sound of Living with Ghosts, with a mix of mellow songs and high-tempo rock and roll songs. The title track, "Flaming Red", is an example of the latter, beginning with an even beat until it increases to a fevered pitch of emotion. Another song from the album, "Tony", is also featured on the charity benefit album Live in the X Lounge.

Her third album, Silver Bell, has a sound similar to its predecessor. It was released by A&M in 2013, 13 years after it was recorded (and well after bootlegged copies had been circulated). A&M dropped Griffin's contract after Silver Bell was recorded, and she was then signed by Dave Matthews's ATO Records. Griffin re-recorded songs from that album for later releases, such as "Making Pies", "Mother of God", "Standing", and "Top of the World". Copies of the unreleased Silver Bell were leaked and bootlegged and can be easily acquired by the B&P (blanks and postage) method on message boards. In August 2013, it was announced that UMe planned to release Silver Bell, mixed by producer Glyn Johns, in October 2013.

Four albums followed on ATO: 1000 Kisses (2002), A Kiss in Time (2003), Impossible Dream (2004), and Children Running Through (2007).

In 2004, Griffin toured with Emmylou Harris, Buddy Miller, Gillian Welch and David Rawlings as the Sweet Harmony Traveling Revue. On February 6, 2007, she released Children Running Through. The album debuted at number 34 on the Billboard 200, with 27,000 copies sold. Of the album, Griffin told Gibson Lifestyle, "I just kind of felt like singing what I wanted to sing, and playing how I wanted to play. It's not all dark and tragic. It's a different way for me to look at things. Getting old—older, I should say, I'm not so serious all the time." It was also said that the album was inspired by her childhood.

Griffin's songs have been recorded by numerous artists, including the Irish-born singer Maura O'Connell ("Long Ride Home"), Linda Ronstadt ("Falling Down"), The Chicks ("Truth No. 2", "Top of the World", "Let Him Fly", "Mary"), Bette Midler, Melissa Ferrick and Missy Higgins ("Moses"), Beth Nielsen Chapman, Christine Collister, and Mary Chapin Carpenter ("Dear Old Friend"), Jessica Simpson ("Let Him Fly"), Martina McBride ("Goodbye"), Emmylou Harris ("One Big Love", "Moon Song"), Bethany Joy Galeotti ("Blue Sky"), the Wreckers ("One More Girl"), Keri Noble and Ruthie Foster ("When It Don't Come Easy"), Joan Osborne ("What You Are"), Solomon Burke ("Up to the Mountain"), and Miranda Lambert ("Getting Ready"). Kelly Clarkson performed "Up to the Mountain" with Jeff Beck on guitar, accompanied by some orchestration on the "Idol Gives Back" episode of American Idol, and the live recording was released as a single immediately afterwards, reaching number 56 on the Billboard Hot 100 in its first week and giving Griffin her highest-charting position as a songwriter. (The audience gave Clarkson a standing ovation following her performance.) Griffin's version of the song was featured in episode 11 of the fourth season of the ABC television show Grey's Anatomy.

Instruments, effects, and sound
 1965 Gibson J-50 Guitar
 1993 Gibson J-200 Junior Guitar
Charles Fox Guitar

Recent work

In September 2008, Griffin sang "You Got Growing Up to Do" in a duet with indie artist Joshua Radin on his album Simple Times. In October 2008, she sang background vocals on Todd Snider's cover of John Fogerty's "Fortunate Son" for Snider's Peace Queer album. In February 2009, she was featured on the album Feel That Fire, by Dierks Bentley, in a duet on the song "Beautiful World". In 2009, Griffin, along with Mavis Staples and the Tri-City Singers released a version of the song "Waiting for My Child to Come Home" on the compilation album Oh Happy Day: An All-Star Music Celebration.

The collaboration with Staples led EMI's Peter York to suggest Griffin make an album of gospel songs. Griffin agreed on the condition that friend and bandmate Buddy Miller produced the record. The album, Downtown Church (her sixth studio album), recorded at the Downtown Presbyterian Church in Nashville, was released on January 26, 2010. The album, featuring Shawn Colvin, Emmylou Harris, and Griffin's long-time friends Buddy and Julie Miller, contains songs by Hank Williams, Willie Mae "Big Mama" Thornton, and "All Creatures of Our God and King" (credited to St. Francis of Assisi).

In July 2010, Robert Plant toured the United States with Band of Joy (reprising the name of his band in the 1960s), with Griffin as a backing vocalist and singer-guitarist Buddy Miller, multi-instrumentalist and vocalist Darrell Scott, bassist-vocalist Byron House, and drummer-percussionist-vocalist Marco Giovino. She is also featured on Plant's solo album Band of Joy, released in September 2010 by Rounder Records.

In 2014 Griffin parted with Plant after a long relationship; they had lived together and divided their time between Austin, Texas, and England. In 2019, Griffin released "River", a track from her upcoming self-titled album and her first new music since battling breast cancer. Patty Griffin was released on March 8, 2019.

On January 11, 2019, along with an official announcement of her new album release Patty Griffin (on her PGM Recordings label via Thirty Tigers), a new song, "River", she announced a 2019 concert tour. She followed this with Tape in 2022.

Film, television, and theater
In 1997, Griffin's song "Not Alone", from the album Living with Ghosts, was used in the final scene and ending credits for the 1997 film Niagara, Niagara. It was also used at the end of episode 6 ("Believers") of season 1 of the television series Crossing Jordan, broadcast on October 29, 2001; on the 2009 release of the soundtrack from the television series Without a Trace; and at the end of episode 12 of season 10 of the television series NCIS, which aired on January 15, 2013.

Griffin has appeared in several movies, including Cremaster 2 and Cameron Crowe's Elizabethtown, the soundtrack of which includes her song "Long Ride Home" and a cover of "Moon River", by Johnny Mercer and Henry Mancini.

In 1997 her song "One Big Love", from the album Flaming Red, was used in the final scenes and credits of the film Digging to China.

In 2004, her song "Rowing Song" was used in episode 9 ("The Trick Is to Keep Breathing") of season 2 of the television series One Tree Hill.

In 2005, her songs "Cold As It Gets", "Rowing Song" and "Forgiveness" were featured in Tim Kirkman's film Loggerheads starring Bonnie Hunt, Tess Harper, Chris Sarandon, Michael Learned, Kip Pardue, and Michael Kelly.  Only "Cold As It Gets" and "Forgiveness" appear on its soundtrack.

The 2006 film Griffin and Phoenix included "Nobody's Crying" and "Rain."

In 2006, her song "Rain" was used in episode 17 ("The Skull in the Desert") of season 1 of the television series Bones.

In 2007, her song “Heavenly Day” was featured prominently at the end of episode 16 (“Promise”) of season 6 of the television series “Smallville”.

In 2007, the Atlantic Theater Company produced 10 Million Miles, an off-Broadway musical, directed by Michael Mayer, with music and lyrics by Griffin.

In 2009, her song "Mary" was used in episode 10 of season 2 of Sons of Anarchy, and "When It Don't Come Easy" closed out season 2, episode 8 of In Plain Sight.

Griffin's first DVD, Patty Griffin: Live From the Artists Den, was filmed on February 6, 2007, at the Angel Orensanz Foundation for the Arts on New York's Lower East Side and released later that year. Selections from the DVD were featured on the program Live from the Artists Den on Ovation TV, beginning January 24, 2008.

In 2007, Griffin was named Artist of the Year by the Americana Music Association, the top honor bestowed by the association, and her album Children Running Through was selected as Best Album. At the awards ceremony she performed "Trapeze" with Emmylou Harris harmonizing.

On June 13, 2008, Griffin performed an acoustic-in-the-round set in Nashville with Kris Kristofferson and Randy Owen (Alabama), for a taping of a PBS songwriters series aired in December 2008. Each of them played five songs; Griffin performed "Top of the World," "Making Pies," "No Bad News," "Up to the Mountain," and "Mary."

In May 2013, her song "Heavenly Day" was used in a commercial for Chevy's new Volt line of automobile, entitled "Volt: Silent Statement".

In May 2015, her song "Go Wherever You Wanna Go" was used in episode 22 of season 10 of the television series Supernatural.

In 2015, the song "Let him fly" was a turning point for Nick Yarris in the documentary "The Fear of Thirteen".

In 2018, the song "Heavenly Day" was featured in episode 5 of season one in the Netflix series Haunting of Hill House.

Discography

Studio albums

Live albums

Other contributions
Lilith Fair: A Celebration of Women in Music (1998) – "Cain" (recorded live during the 1997 tour)
Live at the World Café: Vol. 15 - Handcrafted (2002, World Café) – "Rain"
107.1 KGSR Radio Austin – Broadcasts Vol.10 (2002) – "Rain"
Elizabethtown Soundtrack (2005, RCA Records) – "Long Ride Home", "Moon River"
Oh Happy Day (2009, EMI Gospel/Vector Recordings) – "Waiting for My Child To Come Home" (with Mavis Staples and The Tri-City Singers)
Live at the World Cafe: Vol. 5 (1997, World Cafe Records) – "Every Little Bit"
Live at the World Cafe: Vol. 16 – Sweet Sixteen  (World Cafe Records) – "Makin' Pies"
Feel That Fire (2009) - "Beautiful World" (Dierks Bentley featuring Patty Griffin)
Band of Joy (2010, Decca/Rounder) - backing vocalist for Robert Plant on tracks 2–5, 8, 10-11
I Love Tom T. Hall's Songs of Fox Hollow (2011, Red Beet) – "I Love"

Singles

As a featured artist

Music videos

References

External links

Patty Griffin at the Internet Off Broadway Database

1964 births
American women singer-songwriters
American women country singers
American alternative country singers
American country singer-songwriters
American folk singers
American folk guitarists
ATO Records artists
A&M Records artists
Credential Recordings artists
Grammy Award winners
Living people
Singers from Maine
People from Old Town, Maine
American performers of Christian music
New West Records artists
Songwriters from Maine
Guitarists from Maine
20th-century American guitarists
21st-century American women singers
Band of Joy members
21st-century American singers
20th-century American women guitarists
Thirty Tigers artists